William Skeet (28 July 1906 – 9 July 1989) was a New Zealand cricketer. He played one first-class match for Auckland in 1938/39.

See also
 List of Auckland representative cricketers

References

External links
 

1906 births
1989 deaths
New Zealand cricketers
Auckland cricketers
Cricketers from Auckland